Highwood may refer to:

People
 Sidney Highwood (1896–1975), World War I flying ace

Places

Canada
 Highwood, Calgary, a neighbourhood in Calgary, Alberta
 Highwood (electoral district), a provincial electoral district in Alberta
 Highwood River, a river in Alberta

United Kingdom
 Highwood, Devon
 Highwood, Dorset 
 Highwood, Essex  
 Highwood, Hampshire
 Highwood, Wokingham, a Local Nature Reserve
 Highwood, Worcestershire

United States
 Highwood, Illinois
 Highwood, Montana
 Highwood, Wisconsin
 Highwood, Hamden, a neighborhood in the town of Hamden, Connecticut

Philippines
 Highwood, Batangas, Philippines

See also
 High Wood, a wood in north-east France, scene of a World War I conflict